The Collège Stanislas de Paris, colloquially known as Stan, is a highly selective private Catholic school in Paris, situated on "Rue Notre-Dame-des-Champs" in the 6th arrondissement. It has more than 3,000 students, from preschool to classes préparatoires (classes to prepare students for entrance to the elite grandes écoles such as École Polytechnique, CentraleSupélec, ESSEC Business School, ESCP Business School and HEC Paris), and is the largest private school in France. Stanislas is considered one of the most prestigious and elite French schools. The school was ranked 1st in 2019 for high school.

History
Founded in 1804 by Father Claude Liautard, the Collège has both traditional buildings and modern constructions. Under contract with the French government, it offers curricula identical to those of public education, also offering religious education on specific days - originally Wednesdays, since the Jules Ferry Laws of 1882, but now Saturdays.
In 1822, its formal name was declared, after the Polish King Stanisław Leszczyński, the great-grandfather of the King of France Louis XVIII, whose second forename was "Stanislas".

Since 1903 Collège has been the property of a S.A. corporation founded by former alumni.

Private education in France was indirectly, yet deeply, affected by the strong anti-clerical movement that inspired French politicians throughout the nineteenth and twentieth centuries, beginning with the Concordat of 1801. As a result, the Collège almost disappeared but ultimately was kept open by the efforts of former alumni. Even today, it remains isolated from Paris' foremost public Lycées, although Stanislas' "Classes Préparatoires" ultimately leads its students to the same Grandes Écoles as its rivals.

Famous alumni 
The following are notable people associated with Collège Stanislas de Paris. If the person was a Collège Stanislas de Paris student, the number in parentheses indicates the year of graduation (if known); if the person was a faculty or staff member, that person's title and years of association are included. See also : :fr:Liste d'anciens élèves du Collège Stanislas de Paris

 Pierre Duhem, physicist, philosopher and historian of physics
 General Charles de Gaulle, President of the French Republic
 King Alfonso XII of Spain
 Albert I, Prince of Monaco
 Louis II, Prince of Monaco
 King Charles Albert of Sardinia
 Grand Duke George Mikhailovich of Russia
 Prince Philippe, Duke of Orléans
 Prince Henri of Orléans
 Prince Luiz of Orléans-Braganza
 Roger Frey, President of the Constitutional Council of France
 Maurice Bourgès-Maunoury, Prime Minister of France
 Auguste Champetier de Ribes, President of the Council of the Republic of France
 Pierre Audi
 Francis Bouygues
 Jacques Cousteau
 Gustave Cunéo d'Ornano (1845–1906), lawyer, journalist and politician
 André Dauchez, painter
 Christian Dior
 Jean Bernard Léon Foucault (1819-1868), scientist of Foucault's pendulum fame 
 Anatole France, Nobel Prize
 Carlos Ghosn
 Georges Guynemer
 Job
 Jacques Lacan
 Marcel L'Herbier
 Gilles Perrault
 Edmond Rostand
 Marc Sangnier
 Claude Simon, Nobel Prize
 Alain Soral
 Eugenie Niarchos
 Stavros Niarchos II

Youssef Salim Karam, former Lebanese MP, descendant of Youssef Bey Karam
Taittinger family

See also

 Roger Ninféi

References

External links

 (French) Official school website (School's history page)

Stanislas
Boarding schools in France
Private schools in France
Catholic secondary schools in France
Educational institutions established in 1804
Catholic boarding schools
Buildings and structures in the 6th arrondissement of Paris
1804 establishments in France